The Lake Bécancour is a lake located in the municipality of Thetford Mines in the administrative region of Chaudière-Appalaches, in Quebec, in Canada. It is the source of the Bécancour River, which flows through the Centre-du-Québec administrative region and joins the St. Lawrence River.

Geography 

Toponymy 
The toponym "lac Bécancour" was made official on December 5, 1968, at the Commission de toponymie du Québec.

References 

Lakes of Chaudière-Appalaches
Thetford Mines